Linc, The Linc or LINC may refer to:

Science
LINC, Laboratory Instrument Computer
LINC 4GL, a programming language
LINC complex, a protein complex of the cytoskeleton
LINC complex, or simply LINC, another name for the DREAM complex

Organizations
LINC AB, a Swedish life science-focused investment company
MIT LINC, Learning International Networks Consortium of the Massachusetts Institute of Technology, 
Linc Energy, an Australian energy company
LINC TV, a community television station based in Lismore, New South Wales, from 1993 to 2012

Other
Linc (name), a list of people and fictional characters
Language Instruction for Newcomers to Canada, Canadian federal government language education programme
ASF LINC, Loan Identification Number Code of the American Securitization Forum
Lincoln M. Alexander Parkway, expressway in Hamilton, Ontario, Canada
Lincoln Financial Field, the home stadium of the Philadelphia Eagles
LINC (Learning Innovation Centre), Edge Hill University, Lancashire, England
 LINC, the computer controlling Union City in Beneath a Steel Sky
LINC, reporting mark of the Lewis and Clark Railway, Clark County, Washington, United States

See also
Linc's, an American television series from 1998 to 2000
Lincs Wind Farm, off the east coast of England
Lincs FM, a UK Independent Local Radio radio station serving Lincolnshire and Newark
Library Information Network of Clackamas County (LINCC)
lincRNA, large intergenic non-coding RNA
Lincs (disambiguation)
Link (disambiguation)
Linq (disambiguation)